Lidiya Petrovna Zontova (born 24 February 1936) is a retired Russian rower who won eight European titles between 1955 and 1962. For these achievements she was awarded the Order of the Badge of Honour. After retiring from competitions she worked as engineer at the MAMI Moscow State Technical University.

References

1936 births
Living people
Russian female rowers
Soviet female rowers
European Rowing Championships medalists